This is a list of singles that charted in the top ten of the Billboard Hot 100, an all-genre singles chart, in 2018.

Top-ten singles

Key
 – indicates single's top 10 entry was also its Hot 100 debut
(#) – 2018 year-end top 10 single position and rank

2017 peaks

2019 peaks

Holiday season

Notes 
The duet version of "Perfect", by Sheeran and Beyoncé, was the billing on the chart from December 23, 2017 to January 13, 2018.

The single re-entered the top ten on the week ending January 6, 2018.
The single re-entered the top ten on the week ending February 10, 2018.
The single re-entered the top ten on the week ending March 3, 2018.
The single re-entered the top ten on the week ending March 17, 2018.
The single re-entered the top ten on the week ending March 24, 2018.
The single re-entered the top ten on the week ending April 7, 2018.
The single re-entered the top ten on the week ending May 12, 2018.
The single re-entered the top ten on the week ending May 19, 2018.
The single re-entered the top ten on the week ending June 9, 2018.
The single re-entered the top ten on the week ending June 23, 2018.
The single re-entered the top ten on the week ending June 30, 2018.
The single re-entered the top ten on the week ending July 7, 2018.
The single re-entered the top ten on the week ending July 21, 2018.
The single re-entered the top ten on the week ending July 28, 2018.
The single re-entered the top ten on the week ending August 25, 2018.
The single re-entered the top ten on the week ending September 1, 2018.
The single re-entered the top ten on the week ending September 22, 2018.
The single re-entered the top ten on the week ending October 20, 2018.
The single re-entered the top ten on the week ending November 3, 2018.
The single re-entered the top ten on the week ending December 15, 2018.
The single re-entered the top ten on the week ending December 22, 2018.
The single re-entered the top ten on the week ending January 4, 2020.

See also 
 2018 in American music
 List of Billboard Hot 100 number ones of 2018

References

External links
Billboard.com
Billboard.biz
The Billboard Hot 100

United States Hot 100 Top Ten Singles
2018